Community Shield may refer to:

 FA Community Shield, previously known as the Charity Shield, a one-off game between the winners of the Premier League and the FA Cup
 RFL Community Shield, a competition contested by members of different tier 4 rugby leagues

See also 
 Charity Shield (disambiguation)